"Flux" is a song by English rock band Bloc Party. It was released as a single on 12 November 2007 and produced by Jacknife Lee, along with several other new songs, during the band's week in the studio after their performances at the Carling Weekend: Reading and Leeds Festivals. The song uses mostly electronic instruments and features vocalist Kele Okereke's voice manipulated through Auto-Tune. It was first performed live on 26 September 2007 at Covington's Madison Theater.

CD1 of the set was only released as a free CD through the 14 November 2007 issue of NME. The song peaked at number 8 in the UK Singles Chart as the band's fourth UK Top 10 single. "Flux" is featured on the re-released version of Bloc Party's second studio album A Weekend in the City and on the North American version of their third album Intimacy.

Music video
A music video for the song was directed by director Ace Norton, who has previously directed videos for The Willows, Norah Jones and Death Cab for Cutie. The video was published on NME's website on 17 October 2007. Like the Beastie Boys' music video for "Intergalactic", it pays homage to Japanese kaiju movies. It shows two giant silver robots falling in love while other monsters and robots destroy the city they are in. The band themselves do not appear in the video.

The video was filmed over two days in Boston with American performance troupe Kaiju Big Battel. Some of the Kaiju (Japanese for 'strange beast') characters in the video are the Call-Me-Kevin, Grudyin, Unibouzo, Vegetius, Giii the Space Pirate and Steam-Powered Tentacle Boulder. One of the characters has striking similarities to a Cylon.

Track listing
All lyrics by Kele Okereke, all music composed by Bloc Party (Kele Okereke, Russell Lissack, Gordon Moakes and Matt Tong).

Digital download
 UK single
 "Flux"
 "On" (Principle Participant "Legs" Mix)

7"

CD1

CD2

12"
 Wichita / WEBB135T (United Kingdom) (clear vinyl)
 "Flux" (Extended Version) – 6:32
 "Flux" (Extended Instrumental) – 6:27
 "Where Is Home?" (Burial Remix) – 5:28

Personnel
 Jacknife Lee – production, mixing, programming, keys ("Flux")
 Sam Bell – recording, additional programming ("Flux")
 Eliot James – production, engineering, mixing ("The Once and Future King" and "Emma Kate's Accident")
 Nilesh Patel at The Exchange, London – mastering ("Flux", "The Once and Future King" and "Emma Kate's Accident")
 Dave Cooley – mixing, mastering (live version)
 Gus Oberg – recording (live version)
 Patrick Billiard – recording assistant (live version)
 Tony Perrin – management
 Simon White – management
 Rut Blees Luxembourg – photograph
 Work – graphic design
 EMI Music – publishing
 V2 Music – marketing and distribution

Charts

Weekly charts

Year-end charts

Certifications

References

2007 singles
Bloc Party songs
Song recordings produced by Jacknife Lee
2007 songs
Wichita Recordings singles
Songs written by Kele Okereke
Songs written by Gordon Moakes
Songs written by Russell Lissack
Songs written by Matt Tong